Giovanni Pirro Scorna was a Roman Catholic prelate who served as Bishop of Policastro (1516–1530).

Biography
On 19 Aug 1516, Giovanni Pirro Scorna was appointed by Pope Leo X as Bishop of Policastro. He served as Bishop of Policastro until his resignation on 6 Feb 1530.

References

External links and additional sources
 (for Chronology of Bishops) 
 (for Chronology of Bishops) 

16th-century Italian Roman Catholic bishops
Bishops appointed by Pope Leo X